Roman A. Zubarev is a professor of medicinal proteomics in the Department of Medical Biochemistry and Biophysics at the Karolinska Institutet. His research focuses on the use of mass spectrometry in biology and medicine.

Early life and education
 M.S. in applied physics at Moscow Engineering Physics Institute, 1986
 Ph.D. in ion physics at Uppsala University, 1997

Research interests
 Electron-capture dissociation. In 1997, while in Fred McLafferty's lab at Cornell University, Zubarev discovered the phenomenon of electron-capture dissociation (ECD) of polypeptides. He later developed ECD and other ion-electron reactions2 as analytical techniques in Odense (1998–2002) and Uppsala (2002–2008).
 Isotopic resonance hypothesis. Discovered the phenomenon of isotopic resonance in Uppsala (2008), formulated the isotopic resonance hypothesis and experimentally verified it in Stockholm (2009–2013).
 Isoaspartate theory of Alzheimer’s disease. The role of isoaspartate in Alzheimer’s disease has first been suggested as early as in 1991. Over the next three decades the evidence gradually accumulated, being strongly supported by blood proteomics data.
 Origin of life studies. Zubarev showed that the organic matter produced abiotically in a Miller–Urey experiment can be assimilated by bacteria, and thus proved that early Earth has been a hospitable place for life. For the first time in history of science, Zubarev obtained a living cell from dead matter. In that landmark experiment, bacteria were separated into lipids, nucleic acids and proteins, and these ingredients were isolated and incubated separately and in a mixture. After incubation, the isolates were seeded on Petri dish. While isolated molecules showed no growth (negative control), lipid-containing mixtures gave bacterial colonies, proving that life can self-assemble from a mixture of right ingredients.

Awards
 Curt Brunnée Award, 2006
 Biemann Medal, 2007
 Gold medal, Russian Mass Spectrometry Society, 2013

External links
Roman Zubarev (Karolinska Institutet)
Roman Zubarev (Uppsala University)

References

Mass spectrometrists
Living people
Cornell University people
Year of birth missing (living people)
People from Stavropol